Lepthoplosternum is a small genus of freshwater catfish in the Callichthyinae subfamily of the armored catfish family.

Taxonomy
The type species for this genus is Callichthys pectoralis.  The name is derived from the Greek leptos, meaning "thin", the Greek hoplon, meaning "weapon", and the Greek sternon, meaning "chest" or "sternum". Lepthoplosternum is relatively basal among callichthyines, being sister to the clade comprising Megalechis + Dianema + Hoplosternum. Callichthys is the most basal genus in the subfamily.

L. stellatum and L. ucamara are hypothesized to form a partially unresolved polytomy with L. pectorale and L. beni, which are sister-species to each other. L. tordilho is sister to these four species and L. altamazonicum is the most basal species.

Species 
There are currently six recognized species in this genus:
 Lepthoplosternum altamazonicum R. E. dos Reis, 1997
 Lepthoplosternum beni R. E. dos Reis, 1997
 Lepthoplosternum pectorale (Boulenger, 1895)
 Lepthoplosternum stellatum R. E. dos Reis & Kaefer, 2005
 Lepthoplosternum tordilho R. E. dos Reis, 1997
 Lepthoplosternum ucamara R. E. dos Reis & Kaefer, 2005

Distribution and habitat
Lepthoplosternum is widely distributed in cis-Andean South America south of the Orinoco River basin.

Ecology 
Lepthoplosternum species usually inhabit lentic or slow flowing water bodies and are often associated with marginal or floating vegetation. L. ucamara has even been found in hypoxic conditions. However, the type locality of L. stellatum is a stream, permanently flowing and well oxygenated.

Description
Lepthoplosternum species are the smallest callichthyines (maximum standard length 60.3 mm) and are easily recognized by two synapomorphies: the lower lip with deep medial notch and a small, additional lateral notch forming fleshy projections on each side; and a single unbranched ray preceding the branched ones on the anal fin.

References

Callichthyidae
Fish of South America
Catfish genera
Taxa named by Roberto Esser dos Reis
Freshwater fish genera